The Yang Kui Literature Memorial Museum is a museum in Xinhua District, Tainan, Taiwan. The museum is about Taiwan's author Yang Kui and filmmaker Ou Wei.

History
The museum building was originally a local government building. The building was then donated by Tainan County Government in 2002. The museum was then founded on the building on 27 September 2007.

Architecture
The museum consists of two floors which spreads over 3 buildings.

Exhibition
The museum features the photographs, paintings, manuscripts and documents located in a book storehouse and reading room.

Transportation
The museum is accessible by bus from Tainan Station of Taiwan Railways.

See also
 List of museums in Taiwan

References

2007 establishments in Taiwan
Literary museums in Taiwan
Museums in Tainan